Uralla railway station is a heritage-listed railway station located on the Main Northern line in the Uralla Shire, New South Wales, Australia. It serves the town of Uralla, and opened on 2 August 1882 when the line was extended from Kootingal. It was the terminus of the line until it was extended to Armidale on 3 February 1883. It is also known as Uralla Railway Station group. The property was added to the New South Wales State Heritage Register on 2 April 1999.

Services
Uralla station is served by NSW TrainLink's daily Northern Tablelands Xplorer service operating between Armidale and Sydney.

Description 
The complex includes a type 4 station building, that is standard roadside third class brick, completed in 1883. The platform faces, also made of brick, were completed at the same time.

Heritage listing 
As at 22 November 2010, Uralla is part of a group of sites on the Great Northern line of high significance and a station and residence of high quality and typical of the development on that line. The buildings are significant in the development of the State's railway and to the local community. The gatekeeper's cottage is an excellent example of this early and major form of residence that was used widely throughout the State, particularly on lines constructed in the 1880s. It illustrates the pattern of development of the railway through country areas.

Uralla railway station was listed on the New South Wales State Heritage Register on 2 April 1999 having satisfied the following criteria.

The place possesses uncommon, rare or endangered aspects of the cultural or natural history of New South Wales.

This item is assessed as historically rare. This item is assessed as scientifically rare. This item is assessed as arch. rare. This item is assessed as socially rare.

See also 

List of regional railway stations in New South Wales

References

Bibliography

Attribution

External links
Uralla station details Transport for New South Wales

Easy Access railway stations in New South Wales
John Whitton railway stations
Railway stations in Australia opened in 1882
Regional railway stations in New South Wales
New South Wales State Heritage Register
Uralla, New South Wales
Articles incorporating text from the New South Wales State Heritage Register
Main North railway line, New South Wales